Bergen, New York, is the name of two places in Genesee County, New York: 

Bergen (village), New York 
Bergen (town), New York 

For other places with a similar name, see Bergen (disambiguation).